Geraniol is a monoterpenoid and an alcohol. It is the primary component of citronella oil and is a primary component of rose oil, palmarosa oil. It is a colorless oil, although commercial samples can appear yellow. It has low solubility in water, but it is soluble in common organic solvents. The functional group derived from geraniol (in essence, geraniol lacking the terminal −OH) is called geranyl.

Uses and occurrence
In addition to rose oil, palmarosa oil, and citronella oil, it also occurs in small quantities in geranium, lemon, and many other essential oils. With a rose-like scent, it is commonly used in perfumes. It is used in flavors such as peach, raspberry, grapefruit, red apple, plum, lime, orange, lemon, watermelon, pineapple, and blueberry.

Geraniol is produced by the scent glands of honeybees to mark nectar-bearing flowers and locate the entrances to their hives.  It is also commonly used as an insect repellent, especially for mosquitoes.

The scent of geraniol is reminiscent of, but chemically unrelated to, 2-ethoxy-3,5-hexadiene, also known as geranium taint, a wine fault resulting from fermentation of sorbic acid by lactic acid bacteria.

Geraniol pyrophosphat is important in biosynthesis of other terpenes such as myrcene and ocimene.

Reactions
In acidic solutions, geraniol is converted to the cyclic terpene α-terpineol. The alcohol group undergoes expected reactions.  It can be converted to the tosylate, which is a precursor to the chloride.  Geranyl chloride also arises by the Appel reaction by treating geraniol with triphenylphosphine and carbon tetrachloride.  It can be hydrogenated. It can be oxidized to the aldehyde geranial.

Health and safety
Geraniol is classified as D2B (Toxic materials causing other effects) using the Workplace Hazardous Materials Information System (WHMIS).

History 

Geraniol was first isolated in pure form in 1871 by the German chemist Oscar Jacobsen (1840–1889).  Using distillation, Jacobsen obtained geraniol from an essential oil which was obtained from geranium grass (Andropogon schoenanthus) and which was produced in India.  The chemical structure of geraniol was determined in 1919 by the French chemist Albert Verley (1867–1959).

See also
Citronellol
Citral
Nerol
Rhodinol
Geranyl pyrophosphate
Geranylgeranyl pyrophosphate
Linalool
8-Hydroxygeraniol
Geraniol 8-hydroxylase
Perfume allergy

References

External links
Geraniol MS Spectrum
Geraniol properties, animations, links

Perfume ingredients
Monoterpenes
Primary alcohols
Alkene derivatives
Flavors
Insect repellents